Sincheon or Sinch'ŏn can refer to several things in South and North Korea:

 Sincheon (Gyeonggi), a stream in northern Gyeonggi province
 Sincheon (Daegu), a stream in Daegu
 Sincheon-dong (disambiguation), several neighborhoods
 Sinchon County, in South Hwanghae Province, North Korea
 Sinchon Hot Springs in North Hwanghae Province, North Korea
 Sincheon Station (Seoul) on the Seoul Subway Line 2
 Sincheon Station (Daegu Metro) on the Daegu Subway Line 1